Metaseiulus is a genus of mites in the Phytoseiidae family.

Species
 Metaseiulus denmarki (Chant & Yoshida-Shaul, 1984)
 Metaseiulus luculentis (De Leon, 1959)
 Metaseiulus serratus (Tuttle & Muma, 1973)
 Metaseiulus adjacentis (De Leon, 1959)
 Metaseiulus arboreus (Chant, 1957)
 Metaseiulus anchialus (Kennett, 1958)
 Metaseiulus arceuthobius (Kennett, 1963)
 Metaseiulus bidentatus (Denmark & Evans, in Denmark, Evans, Aguilar, Vargas & Ochoa 1999)
 Metaseiulus bisoni (Chant & Yoshida-Shaul, 1984)
 Metaseiulus brevicollis Gonzalez & Schuster, 1962
 Metaseiulus bromus (Denmark, 1982)
 Metaseiulus camelliae (Chant & Yoshida-Shaul, 1983)
 Metaseiulus citri (Garman & McGregor, 1956)
 Metaseiulus cornus (De Leon, 1957)
 Metaseiulus deleoni (Hirschmann, 1962)
 Metaseiulus edwardi (Chant & Yoshida-Shaul, 1983)
 Metaseiulus eiko (El-Banhawy, 1984)
 Metaseiulus ellipticus (De Leon, 1958)
 Metaseiulus flumenis (Chant, 1957)
 Metaseiulus gramina (Tuttle & Muma, 1973)
 Metaseiulus greeneae (Denmark & Muma, 1967)
 Metaseiulus herbertae (Nesbitt, 1951)
 Metaseiulus johnsoni (Mahr, 1979)
 Metaseiulus juniperoides (De Leon, 1962)
 Metaseiulus lindquisti (Chant & Yoshida-Shaul, 1984)
 Metaseiulus mahri (Chant & Yoshida-Shaul, 1984)
 Metaseiulus mexicanus (Muma, 1963)
 Metaseiulus negundinis (Denmark, 1982)
 Metaseiulus nelsoni (Chant, 1959)
 Metaseiulus neoflumenis Moraes & Kreiter, in Moraes, Kreiter & Lofego 2000
 Metaseiulus paraflumenis (Chant & Yoshida-Shaul, 1984)
 Metaseiulus pedoni (Zaher & Shehata, 1969)
 Metaseiulus pini (Chant, 1955)
 Metaseiulus plumipilis (Denmark, 1994)
 Metaseiulus pomi (Parrott, 1906)
 Metaseiulus pomoides Schuster & Pritchard, 1963
 Metaseiulus profitai (Denmark, 1994)
 Metaseiulus smithi (Schuster, 1957)
 Metaseiulus tuttlei (Denmark, 1982)
 Metaseiulus valentii (Denmark, 1994)
 Metaseiulus validus (Chant, 1957)

References

Phytoseiidae